Pellucialula is a genus of flies belonging to the family Lesser Dung flies.

Species
P. polyseta Papp, 2004

References

Sphaeroceridae
Diptera of Asia
Brachycera genera